Borowina  is a village in the administrative district of Gmina Stanin, within Łuków County, Lublin Voivodeship, in eastern Poland.

The village has a population of 175.

References

Villages in Łuków County